Srinivasa Nagar is a suburb of the city of Tiruchirappalli in Tamil Nadu, India. It is situated on Srirangam Island and forms a part of the Srirangam zone of the Tiruchirappalli Municipal Corporation.

References 

 

Neighbourhoods and suburbs of Tiruchirappalli